Schardt is a surname of European origin. Notable persons with the surname include:

 Arlie Schardt (1895–1980), American athlete
 Hans Schardt (1858–1931), Swiss geologist
 Johan Gregor van der Schardt (c. 1530/31–1581), sculptor
 Sophie von Schardt(1755–1819), Weimar poet 
 Susan Schardt (1872–1934), Austrian philanthropist
 Wilburt Schardt (1886–1964), American baseball player